The Fort Smith Railroad  is a Class III short-line railroad headquartered in Fort Smith, Arkansas.

FSR operates an  line in Arkansas from Fort Smith (where it interchanges with Kansas City Southern Railway, Union Pacific Railroad, and Arkansas and Missouri Railroad) to Fort Chaffee.

FSR traffic generally consists of grain, food products, paper products, scrap and finished steel, lumber, peanuts, alcohol, military equipment, and charcoal.

The FSR currently operates with three ex-Santa Fe Railroad EMD GP20 locomotives.

The portion between Fort Chaffee and Paris was abandoned in 1995. FSR is a subsidiary of Pioneer Railcorp.

Locomotive roster

External links

 Link to Union Pacific Website with FSR Details

Arkansas railroads
Switching and terminal railroads
Spin-offs of the Union Pacific Railroad
Pioneer Lines